Terry Vaughn (born December 25, 1971) is a former Canadian Football League receiver most recently with the Hamilton Tiger-Cats. In 2005, Terry Vaughn's 1113 receiving yards combined with those of his teammates (Kerry Watkins's 1364 yards, Ben Cahoon's 1067 yards, and Dave Stala's 1037 yards) as the 2005 Montreal Alouettes became only the second team in CFL history to achieve four players all having over 1,000 yards receiving in the same season (the first being the 2004 Alouettes). On July 14, 2006 Terry Vaughn became the all-time leader in receptions in the Canadian Football League, surpassing Darren Flutie's previous record of 973 receptions. Vaughn finished the season with 1,006 career receptions, a record which stood until Ben Cahoon broke it on October 11, 2010. Vaughn was the first player in CFL history to record 1,000 career receptions. Vaughn also holds the record for most 1,000+ yards receiving with 11, while also holding the record for most consecutive 1,000+ yards receiving, also with 11. He finished his career in fourth as the CFL's all-time receiving yards leader with 13,746 yards. He announced his retirement as a Calgary Stampeder near the beginning of the 2007 season.

Vaughn played college football at the University of Arizona. He played 12 seasons in the CFL for the Calgary Stampeders, Edmonton Eskimos, Montreal Alouettes and Hamilton Tiger-Cats. Vaughn was a three-time CFL all-star and played in five Grey Cup games, winning with Calgary in 1998 and Edmonton in 2003.

In November, 2006, Terry Vaughn was voted one of the CFL's Top 50 players (#45) of the league's modern era by Canadian sports network TSN.

Vaughn was inducted into the Canadian Football Hall of Fame in 2011.

Vaughn graduated from Oceanside High School.

References

External links
TiCats.ca page

1971 births
Living people
American football wide receivers
American players of Canadian football
Arizona Wildcats football players
Calgary Stampeders players
Canadian Football Hall of Fame inductees
Canadian football slotbacks
Edmonton Elks players
Hamilton Tiger-Cats players
Montreal Alouettes players
Sportspeople from Sumter, South Carolina